Grigory Nikolayevich Neujmin (– 17 December 1946) was a Georgian–Russian astronomer, native of Tbilisi in Georgia, and a discoverer of numerous minor planets as well as 6 periodic and a hyperbolic comet at the Pulkovo and Simeiz Observatories during the first half of the 20th century.

Discoveries 

The Minor Planet Center credits his discoveries under the name "G. N. Neujmin", and his surname appears this way in the literature. However, the modern English transliteration of his name would be Neuymin.

Neujmin is credited with the discovery of 74 asteroids, and notably 951 Gaspra and 762 Pulcova.

He also discovered and co-discovered 6 Jupiter-family comets, namely 25D/Neujmin, 28P/Neujmin, 42P/Neujmin, 57P/du Toit-Neujmin-Delporte (including fragment A) and 58P/Jackson–Neujmin, as well as C/1914 M1 (Neujmin), a hyperbolic comet.

Awards and honors 

He received the Order of the Red Banner of Labour on 10 June 1945. The lunar crater Neujmin is named in his honour, as is 1129 Neujmina, a main-belt asteroid of the Eos family discovered by Praskovjya Parkhomenko at Simeiz Observatory in 1929.

List of discovered minor planets

References 
 

1885 births
1946 deaths
20th-century astronomers
Discoverers of asteroids
Discoverers of comets
Russian astronomers
Soviet astronomers